The Intelligent Design Of Joan of Arc is a compilation album by Joan of Arc, released in 2006 on Polyvinyl Records.

Track listing
 Didactic Prom - 3:20
 Please Sleep - 2:15
 Trial At Orleans - 4:11
 Busy Bus, Sunny Sun - 5:17
 Stemingway and Heinbeck - 4:24
 A Picture Postcard - 3:17
 Forensic Economics - 4:28
 You (Single) - 5:26
 I'm Sorry I Got So Drunk Before My Solo Set in Tokyo - 5:30
 My Girlfriend Dumped Me After the Free Trip to Japan - 5:35
 Please Don't Mistake My Arrogance for Shyness - 4:07
 For a Half-Deaf Girl Named Echo - 4:06
 George, Oh Well  (stand and clap) - 1:12
 For the Skinheads and Hippies - 1:54
 You Say Tornaydo and I Say Tornahdo - 2:03
 Kissinger's Lament - 4:31
 Violencii Or Violencum - 4:11
 The Evidence - 6:20
 Song For Josh - 4:09

References

Joan of Arc (band) albums
2006 albums